Alexander Hauck (born 18 April 1988) is a German international rugby union player, playing for the SC 1880 Frankfurt in the Rugby-Bundesliga and the German national rugby union team.

Hauck played in the 2010 and 2011 German championship final for SC 1880 Frankfurt, both of which the club lost.

He made his debut for Germany in a friendly against Hong Kong on 12 December 2009. Originally from South Africa, Hauck is eligible to play for Germany because of his German roots.

Honours

Club
 German rugby union championship
 Runners up: 2010, 2011
 German rugby union cup
 Winners: 2010

Stats
Alexander Hauck's personal statistics in club and international rugby:

Club

 As of 30 April 2012

National team

European Nations Cup

Friendlies & other competitions

 As of 8 April 2012

References

External links
 Alexander Hauck at scrum.com
   Alexander Hauck at totalrugby.de
  Alexander Hauck at the DRV website

1988 births
Living people
South African rugby union players
German rugby union players
Germany international rugby union players
South African people of German descent
SC 1880 Frankfurt players
Rugby union number eights